Sugrue is an anglicized form of the Irish Language surname , meaning "descendant of Siocfhradh", or Ó Siochrú the modern Gaelic equivalent of Ó Seochrú, which in turn is a Gaelic version of the old norse German given first name Siegfried, meaning "victory and peace".

It probably links to the name Ó Súilleabháin, most likely a minor sept of this family, and owes its origins to the province of Munster, mainly the counties of Kerry, Cork, and Limerick, Kerry being the more numerous. Although this name is not the most popular by way of rank for this province, it is most certainly not rare for this part of Ireland. The name is uniquely Irish in that it predates Norman settlement, and although scholars cannot pinpoint exactly when the name first appeared in Ireland, it is thought most probably to be an adoption of a small, early Norse settlement, most probably between 8th and 10th century AD.

First-name adoption was a common and fashionable practice in early Ireland, as there were no hereditary surnames until around the 11th century, therefore the first name often became the last name once this system was introduced. The family's motto is "Lamh Foistenach Abu", "The Hand Of Victory".

Various forms for the name Sugrue are:  Ó Siochfhradha, Ó Seochfhradha, Ó Seochrú, Ó Siochrú, Ó Siocfhradha, Ó Siochradha, Shuckerow, Shugrue, Sughrue, O'Sughrue, and Sichwroe.

The surname Sugrue may refer to:

Betty Sugrue, Irish camogie player
Elizabeth Sugrue (1740s–1807), executioner
James Sugrue, Irish golfer
John Sugrue, Irish sportsman
Mark Sugrue (born 1993), Irish Gaelic footballer and hurler
Patrick Sugrue, Irish language author and educator
Paul Sugrue (born 1960), British footballer
Thomas Sugrue (born 1962), American historian 
Thomas Joseph Sugrue (1907–1953), American writer
Tommy Sugrue, Irish Gaelic football referee

References

Surnames of Irish origin
English-language surnames